In chemistry and crystallography, crystal structures that have the same set of interatomic distances are called homometric structures. Homometric structures need not be congruent (that is, related by a rigid motion or reflection). Homometric crystal structures produce identical diffraction patterns; therefore, they cannot be distinguished by a diffraction experiment.

Recently, a Monte Carlo algorithm was proposed to calculate the number of homometric structures corresponding to any given set of interatomic distances.

See also 

 Patterson function
 Arthur Lindo Patterson

Notes 

Stereochemistry